Dina Pouryounes Langeroudi (born 1 January 1992) is a taekwondo athlete from Iran. She participated in the Tokyo Olympics in 2021. She is ranked number 3 in the world taekwondo rankings. She was runner-up 🥈 in the 2018 European Championship. She medalled 🥉 in the 2012 Asian Championship. She has won more than 40 G1 & G2 medals. For eight years, she participated in the Iranian national team. She now fights under the IOC team flag.

Pouryounes left Iran for The Netherlands in 2015. In September 2015, she won her first international medal at the Polish Open while she was still living in an asylum centre. In 2017, she won the Turkish Open and World Taekwondo started supporting her in late 2017. She then became the first refugee athlete to compete in a World Taekwondo Championships. She defended her Turkish Open title in 2018, before taking the Dutch Open title and winning silver in the European Senior Championships in Kazan. She also won another Dutch Open in 2019, and three silver medals at world-ranking tournaments in 2020.

She was included as one of 29 members of the IOC Refugee Olympic Team to compete at the 2020 Summer Olympics.

External link

References

1992 births
Living people
Taekwondo practitioners at the 2020 Summer Olympics
Iranian female taekwondo practitioners
Iranian refugees
Refugee Olympic Team at the 2020 Summer Olympics
21st-century Iranian women